The Ras Makunduchi Lighthouse is located at the south eastern tip of Ugunja island in Zanzibar, Tanzania. The lighthouse is located near the village of Makunduchi The lighthouse is a 27m squared concrete tower painted red and white. The tower has 165 steps to the top and has two non resident operators. Since the lighthouse is in Zanzibar, it is managed by the Zanzibar Ports Corporation instead of the Tanzania Ports Authority.

See also

List of lighthouses in Tanzania

References

External links 
 Tanzania Ports Authority

Lighthouses in Tanzania
Lighthouses completed in 1919
Buildings and structures in Zanzibar